Mizzen and Main (styled Mizzen+Main) is an American clothing company that specializes in performance menswear. Their products are available online and produced in the United States   including performance fabric dress shirts, polos, flannels, pullovers, joggers, pants, chinos, jackets, vests, and blazers. The brand was launched in 2012 with headquarters based in Dallas, Texas.

History
Mizzen+Main was co-founded in 2012 by Kevin Lavelle who served as the company CEO until stepping down in April 2019.  Chris Phillips, formerly head of men's clothing at Stitch Fix, became CEO of Mizzen+Main in April 2019. Chris Phillips exited Mizzen+Main early January 2021. Ryan Kent, the former COO, is now President and acting CEO.

Lavelle, a graduate of  Southern Methodist University, worked as a management consultant. The idea for the firm's signature product, a fabric performance dress shirt, originated in 2005 when he was in Washington D.C. as an intern. He said that he noticed sweat stains on the shirt of a congressional staffer, leading to the idea of producing a moisture-wicking dress shirt similar in style to athletic clothing. He experimented with numerous fabrics  before finding a combination that became the first prototype. The company officially launched in July 2012.

The firm was initially self-funded but later received an investment from several angel investors.    It began by selling its products online and adding boutiques that carried the products in large stores. The brand made wholesale retail a part of its distribution strategy, partnering with men's specialty stores and golf pro shops. The initial offering included two dress shirt designs. In 2013, it caught the eye of executives from Saks Fifth Avenue, and was invited to be one of two pop-up stores inside of Saks' New York store as part of Super Bowl XLVIII weekend.  In the summer of 2014, the firm raised an additional round of capital from a variety of investors.

Endorsements 
In September 2015, Houston Texans defensive end J.J. Watt signed an endorsement deal with the company in return for an undisclosed equity share of the business. In July 2017, J.J. Watt and Mizzen+Main launched "The J.J. Watt Collection," a clothing line "that includes eight pieces ranging from polos to dress shirts."

Products
Some Mizzen+Main products are manufactured in the United States with a portion of each sale being donated to charities and programs for veterans. Its product line includes moisture-wicking and wrinkle-free dress shirts as well as polos, flannels, pullovers, joggers, chinos, jackets, vests, and blazers.

References

External links
 Mizzen+Main official website

Companies based in Dallas
American companies established in 2012
2012 establishments in Texas
Clothing companies established in 2012